FC Avangard Kursk is an association football club based in Kursk, Russia, currently playing in the third tier of Russian football. The team's colors are: home all blue, and away all white.

History
The club has been known under the following names:
 Spartak, 1946–1957
 Trudovye Rezervy, 1958–1965 and 1967–1972
 Trud, 1966
 Avangard, 1973–
Spartak made an appearance in the Soviet league in 1946. Since 1957 Kursk was continuously represented in the league by Trudovye Rezervy, Trud, and Avangard. The club played in Class B and in the Second League. The best achievement was the second position in the zone in 1962 and 1964.

Avangard entered the Russian Second League in 1992 and was moved to the Third League in 1994, after the number of clubs in the Second League was significantly reduced. In 1995, they won promotion to the Second League, and in 2004 Avangard finished second in their Second Division zone, obtaining promotion to the First Division. Avangard played 3 seasons in First Division and relegated to Second Division in 2007 as 18th. Avangard returned to second level in 2009 as Center Group champion. But, Avangard finished in the last place and was relegated to third level in 2010. The club won its PFL zone and was promoted back to the second-tier Russian Football National League at the end of the 2016–17 season.

In the 2017–18 season, the team has reached the final of the Russian Cup, defeating two Premier League clubs (CSKA and Amkar) during the competition. They lost the final 1–2 to FC Tosno on a late goal by Reziuan Mirzov.

In February 2019, Avangard competed in the FNL Cup. They got into finals, where they had to play against FC Rotor Volgograd. The match took place on 20 February. After the full-time, the score was 1:1, with Mikhail Zemskov scoring the opening goal for Avangard on 80' minute and a quick response by Anzor Sanaya on 86' minute of the match. The match has ultimately ended in a penalty shoot-out, where Avangard was able to grab a 3–4 victory.

On 17 May 2020, the club announced that they will be voluntarily relegated to the third-tier PFL for the 2020–21 season due to lack of necessary financing.

League history

Russia
{|class="wikitable" style="text-align: center;"
|- style="background:#efefef;"
! Season
! Div.
! Pos.
! Pl.
! W
! D
! L
! GS
! GA
! P
!Cup
!colspan=2|Europe
!Top scorer (league)
!Head coach
|-
||1992||rowspan="2"|3rd, zone 2||10||42||22||3||17||67||67||47||-||colspan="2"|-||align="left"| Tolmachov – 21||align="left"| Galkin
|-
||1993|| style="background:pink;"|6||30||15||1||14||44||59||31||R512||colspan="2"|-||align="left"| Sukhorukov – 14||align="left"| Galkin
|-
||1994||rowspan="2"|4th, zone 2||4||32||19||4||9||51||39||42||R128||colspan="2"|-||align="left"| Sukhorukov – 12||align="left"| Galkin
|-
||1995|| style="background:lightgreen;"|1||30||21||2||7||52||30||65||R256||colspan="2"|-||align="left"| Gershun – 10||align="left"| Galkin
|-
||1996||rowspan="2"|3rd, "West"||15||38||13||4||21||50||78||43||R128||colspan="2"|-||align="left"| Delov – 10||align="left"| Galkin
|-
||1997||15||38||11||7||20||40||58||40||R512||colspan="2"|-||align="left"| Delov – 16||align="left"| Galkin
|-
||1998||rowspan="7"|3rd, "Center"||18||40||9||9||22||34||54||36||R256||colspan="2"|-||align="left"| Buda – 10||align="left"| Galkin
|-
||1999||15||36||10||7||19||40||59||37||R256||colspan="2"|-||align="left"| Delov – 9||align="left"| Galkin
|-
||2000||8||38||16||6||16||36||41||54||R128||colspan="2"|-||align="left"| Gershun – 9||align="left"| Galkin
|-
||2001||8||38||17||7||14||47||41||58||R512||colspan="2"|-||align="left"| Gershun – 12||align="left"| Galkin
|-
||2002||15||38||11||8||19||40||55||41||R512||colspan="2"|-||align="left"| E. Kalashnikov – 10||align="left"| Galkin
|-
||2003||13||36||10||7||19||28||37||37||R512||colspan="2"|-||align="left"| E. Kalashnikov – 5||align="left"| Galkin  Delov
|-
||2004|| style="background:lightgreen;"|2||32||21||5||6||60||23||68||R512||colspan="2"|-||align="left"| Larin – 12||align="left"| Delov
|-
||2005||rowspan="3"|2nd||16||42||11||15||16||36||45||48||R256||colspan="2"|-||align="left"| Sigachev – 6||align="left"| Delov
|-
||2006||10||42||16||13||13||45||38||61||R64||colspan="2"|-||align="left"| Martynov – 7||align="left"| Borzykin
|-
||2007|| style="background:pink;"|18||42||15||6||21||50||55||51||R64||colspan="2"|-||align="left"| Bukievsky – 11  Korovushkin – 11||align="left"| Gorlukovich
|-
||2008||rowspan="2"|3rd, "Center"||2||34||23||6||5||48||18||75||R32||colspan="2"|-||align="left"| S. Mikhailov – 10||align="left"| Esipov
|-
||2009|| style="background:lightgreen;"|1||32||24||1||7||68||23||73||R64||colspan="2"|-||align="left"| Borozdin – 11||align="left"| Esipov
|-
||2010||2nd|| style="background:pink;"|20||38||7||6||25||31||67||27||R32||colspan="2"|-||align="left"| Korovushkin – 7||align="left"| Esipov   Sergeyev   Ignatenko
|-
||2011–12 ||3rd, "Center" || 2||39||21||7||11||62||36||79||R128||colspan="2"|-||align="left"| Sargsyan – 17||align="left"| Ignatenko Frantsev
|-
||2012–13 ||3rd, "Center" || 9||30||11||8||11||42||40||41||R64||colspan="2"|-||align="left"| Akhba – 8||align="left"| Frantsev Zazulin
|}

Current squad
As of 21 February 2023, according to the Second League website.

Notable players
Had international caps for their respective countries. Players whose name is listed in bold represented their countries while playing for Avangard.

Russia/USSR
 Albert Borzenkov
 Valeri Chizhov
 Artyom Rebrov
 Valery Yesipov

Former USSR countries
 Andrey Paryvayew
 Vitaliy Abramov
 Gheorghe Boghiu
 Vladimir Cosse

 Oleg Șișchin
 Andriy Annenkov

Asia
 Anzour Nafash

References

External links
Fans' website 
Official site

 
Football clubs in Russia
Sport in Kursk
1946 establishments in Russia
Association football clubs established in 1946